Garland D. Gregory (March 8, 1919 – April 28, 2011) was an All-America Football Conference (AAFC) guard who played two seasons with the San Francisco 49ers. He played college football at Louisiana Polytechnic Institute and attended Columbia High School in Columbia, Louisiana.

College career
Gregory lettered for the Louisiana Tech Bulldogs from 1940 to 1941. He became the school's first Associated Press first-team All-American in 1941.

Military career
Gregory volunteered to serve in the United States Army Air Forces on December 8, 1941 and was a first lieutenant with the 4th Air Force. Gregory was chosen to play football with the Fourth Air Force Flyers and Hollywood Bears.

Professional career
Gregory played for the San Francisco 49ers of the AAFC from 1946 to 1947. He was named Second-team All-AAFC by the New York Daily News in 1947.

Coaching career
He coached at various schools after his playing career, including Bastrop High School in Bastrop, Louisiana, the Virginia Military Institute and El Dorado High School in El Dorado, Arkansas. He helped the El Dorado High School Wildcats win back-to-back state championships in 1958 and 1959.

References

External links
 Just Sports Stats

1919 births
2011 deaths
American football guards
Louisiana Tech Bulldogs football players
San Francisco 49ers players
VMI Keydets football coaches
High school football coaches in Arkansas
High school football coaches in Louisiana
United States Army Air Forces officers
United States Army Air Forces personnel of World War II
People from Caldwell Parish, Louisiana
Players of American football from Louisiana